Nayef bin Mamdouh Al Saud (born 1971) is a member of the Saudi royal family, the House of Saud.

Biography
Nayef is the son of Mamdouh bin Abdulaziz, former governor of Tabuk Province. He received his bachelor's degree in Islamic Studies from King Abdul Aziz University in Jeddah, and earned a master's degree in Islamic theology at the Islamic University of Madinah.

Nayef is known for his inventions, which include a rescue and relief helicopter with a massive firefighting unit, for which he received a grand prize at the International Federation for Inventors (IFIA), Geneva International Exhibition of Inventions.

Personal life
Prince Nayef is married and has five children:-
Prince Abdullah bin Nayef
Prince Abdul Rahman bin Nayef
Prince  Nawwaf bin Nayef
Princess Faiza bint Nayef
Princess Sultana bint Nayef

References

External links
Nayef bin Mamdouh Official website

Nayef

1971 births
Islamic University of Madinah alumni
King Abdulaziz University alumni
Living people
People from Riyadh
Nayef